AK Chellaiya was an Indian politician and former Member of the Legislative Assembly. He was elected to the Travancore-Cochin assembly as an Indian National Congress candidate from Colachel constituency in 1952 election.

Year of birth missing
Year of death missing
Indian National Congress politicians from Tamil Nadu
20th-century Indian politicians
Travancore–Cochin MLAs 1952–1954